Una Peaks, formerly known as Cape Renard Towers, are two towers of basalt, each topped by a cap of ice, guarding the northern entrance to the Lemaire Channel on the Antarctic Peninsula. The peaks appear on a British Antarctic Territory stamp although they are not identified as such. The individual towers are referred to as "buttresses".

Una Spivey was the name of a secretary in the governor's office in Stanley, Falkland Islands who was working for what is now the British Antarctic Survey. The tallest tower has only been summited once; this was by a German team in 1999.

See also
Lemaire Channel
Breast shaped hills

References

Sources
Lonely Planet, Antarctica: a Lonely Planet Travel Survival Kit, Oakland, CA: Lonely Planet Publications, 1996, p. 305
 Antarctica. Sydney: Reader's Digest, 1985, pp. 126–127.
 U.S. National Science Foundation, Geographic Names of the Antarctic, Fred G. Alberts, ed. Washington: NSF, 1980.

External links

 

Rock formations of Graham Land